Pierre Sotoumey (born 11 June 1955) is a Beninese boxer. He competed in the men's welterweight event at the 1980 Summer Olympics. At the 1980 Summer Olympics, he lost to Andrés Aldama of Cuba.

References

1955 births
Living people
Beninese male boxers
Olympic boxers of Benin
Boxers at the 1980 Summer Olympics
Place of birth missing (living people)
Welterweight boxers